Domingos Alexandre Martins da Costa (born 6 September 1979), commonly known as Alex, is a Portuguese former professional footballer who played mainly as a right-back, currently manager of S.C. Covilhã.

Over seven seasons (15 years in total as a professional), he amassed Primeira Liga totals of 170 matches and seven goals, mainly at the service of Vitória de Guimarães. He also spent four years in Germany, with VfL Wolfsburg.

Playing career
Alex was born in Guimarães. After five years, spent at the service of AD Fafe and Moreirense FC, he made his Primeira Liga debut with S.L. Benfica, mainly deputising for established Miguel. In 2004–05, he served a season-long loan spell at Vitória de Guimarães.

After good performances at Vitória, which earned him a Portugal national team call-up – three matches, including two in the 2006 FIFA World Cup qualifiers– Benfica sold Alex to VfL Wolfsburg on the final days of the summer transfer window. He had a relatively successful debut campaign, but only appeared four times in the Bundesliga over the next three (none in the last two).

In late May 2009, Alex signed with former club Vitória de Guimarães on a free transfer. During that first season he operated mostly as a right-back, going on to be fully reconverted to the position the following years and being first-choice.

Coaching career
On 3 July 2013, Alex announced his retirement from professional football at the age of nearly 34, immediately starting his managerial career with F.C. Felgueiras 1932 in the third division. He first arrived at the professionals in May 2014 after leading his team to safety, being appointed at Segunda Liga side Académico de Viseu FC.

Career statistics

Club

International

Honours
Moreirense
Segunda Liga: 2001–02

Benfica
Taça de Portugal: 2003–04
Supertaça Cândido de Oliveira: 2005

Vitória Guimarães
Taça de Portugal: 2012–13

References

External links

1979 births
Living people
Sportspeople from Guimarães
Portuguese footballers
Association football defenders
Association football midfielders
Primeira Liga players
Liga Portugal 2 players
Segunda Divisão players
AD Fafe players
Moreirense F.C. players
S.L. Benfica footballers
Vitória S.C. players
Vitória S.C. B players
Bundesliga players
VfL Wolfsburg players
Portugal international footballers
Portuguese expatriate footballers
Expatriate footballers in Germany
Portuguese expatriate sportspeople in Germany
Portuguese football managers
Liga Portugal 2 managers
Académico de Viseu F.C. managers
S.C. Covilhã managers